Monte Sirente is a mountain in Abruzzo, central Italy, the highest peak (at 2,349 m) of a small chain extending for c. 13 km from the Altopiano delle Rocche, the Marsica and the Valle Subequana, ending to the Fucino plain. It is part of the Sirente-Velino Regional Park.

The northern side of Sirente is characterized by deep gorges created by glaciers during the last Pleistocene glaciation. The southern side declines in a more milder way towards the Fucino.

Nearby is the Sirente crater.

See also
Monte Velino

Mountains of Abruzzo
Mountains of the Apennines
Two-thousanders of Italy